Lac d'Arboréiaz is a lake in Saint-Germain-les-Paroisses and Colomieu in the Ain department of France.

External links
   

Arboreiaz